The Happy Lands is a 2012 British film written by Peter Cox and Robert Rae about a coal-mining community in  Fife, Scotland, during the long strike of 1926. The film was released on 17 February 2012. Much of the film's dialogue is in the Scots language.

The film begins with a miner suffering a back injury at a colliery in the fictional village of Carhill. When confronted about working conditions, the mine owner responds by saying that the workers are locked out until they accept a settlement that involves longer working hours and lower wages. The rest of the film shows the various stages of the eight-month strike by coal miners across Britain, including the general strike launched by the Trade Union Congress in support of the miners. The film makes several references to the First World War, in which many of the striking miners fought and were rewarded for their bravery.

Cast
 Kevin Clarke as Michael Brogan
 Jokie Wallace as Dan Guthrie
 Aaron Jones as Wee Baxie
 David Reilly as Joe Guthrie
 Kevin Adair as Davey King
 Farah Ahmed as Mary Miller
 Stevie Allan as Pug Henderson
 Jez Arrow as Economic League
 Michael Barney as Special Constable
 Madeline Berry as Granny King
 Josh Brown as Pat Brogan
 Cllr Willie Clarke as Regional Union Official
 Craig Clarke as Andy Jenkins
 Kristen Clarke as Billy Jenkins
 Patricia Colville as Jenny Saville
 Fiona Combe as Lily Wilson
 Allan Stewart as Harry Lauder
 Megan Taylor as Susie Smith
 Michael Todd as Miner

References

External links
 Official website
 UNISON Scotland's webpage on the film
 BBC's webpage on the film
 The Happy Lands at the Internet Movie Database
 Relatives pay tribute to mining heroes of 1926 general strike in new film The Happy Lands
 Fife man keen to mine his newly-found acting talent

2012 films
2010s historical drama films
British buddy films
British historical drama films
English-language Scottish films
Fife
Films set in Scotland
Films shot in Scotland
Films shot in Fife
Scots-language films
Scottish films
2010s English-language films
2010s British films